Travis Benjamin Rush is a country music singer from Oregon.

Discography

Albums
 Come And Get It (2007)
 Feel (2010)

Singles

Music videos

References 

American country singer-songwriters
American male singer-songwriters
Living people
Oregon State University alumni
Singer-songwriters from California
People from Orange, California
People from Gold Beach, Oregon
21st-century American singers
Country musicians from California
21st-century American male singers
Singer-songwriters from Oregon
Year of birth missing (living people)